The Suvodol monastery is a Serbian Orthodox monastery located in the cadastral area of Selačka, a village 25 km south-east of Zaječar, in neastern Serbia. It is administratively part of the Eparchy of Timok. According to legend it was either built by the Byzantine Empire in the period between 1004 and 1008, or by Prince Lazar Hrebeljanović in the 14th century. The oldest specimen is a grave monument from 1255. The Old church was destroyed in 1865, and a new one started building in August 1866.

See also 
List of heads of the Serbian Orthodox Church
Serbian Orthodox Church

References

External links 

http://www.lerzajecar.com/src/srb-crk.htm

Christian monasteries established in the 11th century
Christian monasteries established in the 14th century
14th-century Serbian Orthodox church buildings
19th-century Serbian Orthodox church buildings
Religious organizations established in 1866
Zaječar